Clarence Lloyd Servold (28 March 1927 – 4 February 2019) was a Canadian cross-country skier who competed in the 1956 Winter Olympics and in the 1960 Winter Olympics. He was inducted into the Canadian Ski Hall of Fame in 1984.

References

1927 births
2019 deaths
Canadian male cross-country skiers
Canadian male Nordic combined skiers
Olympic cross-country skiers of Canada
Olympic Nordic combined skiers of Canada
Cross-country skiers at the 1956 Winter Olympics
Nordic combined skiers at the 1960 Winter Olympics
Nordic combined at the 1960 Winter Olympics